Flåmsdalen is a valley in Aurland Municipality in Vestland county,  Norway. The river Flåmselvi runs through the valley, as does the Flåm Line, a famous tourist destination.

Media gallery

References

External links

Valleys of Vestland
Aurland